St. Luke's Regional Medical Center is a full-service, non-profit hospital serving Sioux City, Iowa, and residents in nearby communities in Iowa, South Dakota and Nebraska. The hospital is part of a larger health system which includes St. Luke’s Health Foundation, St. Luke’s College and a clinic network of family practice and specialty providers.

The 154 staffed-bed hospital employs a staff of over 1,200 employees plus a medical staff of 300. A volunteer workforce of 300 supplement care provided at St. Luke's. Each year, some 65,000 outpatients and nearly 9,000 inpatients are cared for at the hospital.

As a community hospital, St. Luke's contributes approximately $10.3 million in community benefit according to a recent Iowa Hospital Association assessment. In addition, Iowa Hospital Association reports St. Luke's jobs have a positive spin off effect on the local economy, bringing over $80 million in revenue. Recognized for children's services, St. Luke's welcomes approximately 2,000 babies each year in its Birth Center which includes the area's only level II neonatal intensive care unit. In addition, St. Luke's is the area's only Spirit of Women hospital, a national network of hospitals committed to education, programs and services focused on women's health. St. Luke's has approximately 2,000 women enrolled in its Spirit of Women program

In 2011, the hospital opened a new multimillion-dollar surgical services unit offering modern amenities and state-of-the-art technology. Through its Center for  Heart and Vascular Health, St. Luke's offers a comprehensive set of treatments and preventive  cardiology procedures. Other areas of care include the Bomgaars Cancer Center, digestive disorders and emergency and trauma department.

History
St. Luke's roots can be traced back to Sioux City's first hospital, Samaritan, in the 1880s. Samaritan later merged with Methodist Hospital, and in the 1960s, Methodist and Lutheran Hospitals consolidated to form St. Luke's Regional Medical Center. St. Luke's new hospital was constructed at the corner of 27th and Stone Park Boulevard in Sioux City. Starting as a single acute-care hospital, St. Luke's grew to include a health system with St. Luke's College, St. Luke's Health Foundation and an entire clinic network. In addition, statewide efforts such as the Iowa Statewide Poison Control Center and My Nurse, a 24/7 health helpline, can trace their roots back to St. Luke's.

In 1995, St. Luke's joined a grassroots partnership with other Iowa hospitals to form Iowa Health System. Today, the organization is known as UnityPoint and is the fifth largest non-denominational health system in America. Through relationships with 25 hospitals in metropolitan and rural communities and more than 160 physician clinics, Iowa Health System provides care throughout Iowa and Illinois.

Achievements
 Siouxland's preferred hospital in 2011 by National Research Corporation
 2011 OR of the Year Award for New Construction, Surgical Products Magazine
 2011 Community Value Five-Star® Facility, Cleverley +Associates Community Value Index®
 Only Siouxland accredited DNV hospital for primary stroke care
 Premier Hospital for Excellence in Women's Health by Spirit of Women
 Gold Award for Stroke Care from American Heart Association's Get with the Guidelines
 Ranked among Thomson Reuters Top 100 Health Systems Nationwide, Iowa Health System and its affiliates including St. Luke's

Hospital rating data
The HealthGrades website contains the latest quality data for St. Luke's Regional Medical Center, as of 2015. For this rating section three different types of data from HealthGrades are presented: quality ratings for twenty-nine inpatient conditions and procedures, thirteen patient safety indicators and the percentage of patients giving the hospital a 9 or 10 (the two highest possible ratings).

For inpatient conditions and procedures, there are three possible ratings: worse than expected, as expected, better than expected.  For this hospital the data for this category is:
Worse than expected - 5
As expected - 22
Better than expected - 2
For patient safety indicators, there are the same three possible ratings. For this hospital safety indicators were rated as:
Worse than expected - 2
As expected - 10
Better than expected - 1
Percentage of patients rating this hospital as a 9 or 10 - 69%
Percentage of patients who on average rank hospitals as a 9 or 10 - 69%

References

External links
Official site of St. Luke's Regional Medical Center
St. Luke’s Health Foundation
St. Luke's College

Hospital buildings completed in 1966
Hospitals established in 1966
1966 establishments in Iowa
1880s establishments in Iowa
Hospitals established in the 1880s
Buildings and structures in Sioux City, Iowa
Hospitals in Iowa
UnityPoint Health